Jo-Wilfried Tsonga was the defending champion but decided to compete at the If Stockholm Open instead.
Juan Martín del Potro won the title, defeating Grega Žemlja 7–5, 6–3 in the final.

Seeds
The first four seeds received a bye into the second round.

Draw

Finals

Top half

Bottom half

Qualifying

Seeds

Qualifiers

Draw

First qualifier

Second qualifier

Third qualifier

Fourth qualifier

References
 Main Draw
 Qualifying Draw

Erste Bank Open - Singles
2012 Singles